Leave the Light On may refer to:

 Leave the Light On (Lorrie Morgan album), a 1989 album by Lorrie Morgan
 Leave the Light On (Beth Hart album), a 2003 album by Beth Hart
 Leave the Light On (Chris Smither album), a 2006 album by Chris Smither
 Leave the Light On (Jeff Bates album), a 2006 album by Jeff Bates
 Leave the Light On (EP), a 2022 EP by Bailey Zimmerman
 Leave the Light On (memoir), the second memoir written by Jennifer Storm

See also
 Leave a Light On (disambiguation)
 Leave Your Light On, Aloud's 2006 debut album